The Australian Performing Group (APG) was a Melbourne-based experimental theatre repertory ensemble formed in an official capacity in 1970 from the La Mama theatre group. Created to address a dissatisfaction with Australia's theatrical climate, the APG focused primarily on producing new works by then-emerging Australian writers such as Barry Oakley, Jack Hibberd, Kris Hemensley, Bill Garner, John Romeril, Steve J. Spears and David Williamson.

The APG comprised many sub-groups interested in developing different ideas and shows, e.g. groups of writers, actors, musicians, etc.

In 1977 two of the APG groups, Soapbox Circus and The Captain Matchbox Whoopee Band, teamed up with New Ensemble Circus to create Circus Oz, originally funded by the APG.

See also
 John Timlin, a financier of the Australian Performing Group

References

Theatre in Melbourne
Theatre companies in Australia